The 1920–21 Holy Cross Crusaders men's basketball team represented The College of the Holy Cross during the 1908–09 college men's basketball season. The head coach was William Casey, coaching the crusaders in his first season.

Schedule

|-

References

Holy Cross Crusaders men's basketball seasons
Holy Cross